Angelo Tafa (born 5 July 2000) is an Albanian professional footballer who plays as a goalkeeper for Albanian club FK Kukësi.

References

External links

2000 births
Living people
Albanian footballers
Albania youth international footballers
Albanian expatriate footballers
Albanian expatriate sportspeople in Greece
Association football goalkeepers
Kategoria Superiore players
FK Kukësi players
Greek people of Albanian descent
Albanians in Greece